Accent on the Blues is an album by American organist John Patton recorded in 1969 and released on the Blue Note label.

Reception

The Allmusic review by Stephen Thomas Erlewine awarded the album 3 stars and stated "Accent on the Blues is among the most atmospheric music Patton has ever made. While it stops short of being free, it's hardly funky soul-jazz, and that may disappoint some fans of his rip-roaring style. Nevertheless, the album is a rewarding listen, primarily because it displays a more reflective side of his talent".

Track listing
All compositions by John Patton except as indicated
 "Rakin' and Scrapin'" (Harold Mabern) – 10:05
 "Freedom Jazz Dance" (Eddie Harris) – 4:44
 "Captain Nasty" (Marvin Cabell) – 5:06
 "Village Lee" (Cabell) – 7:21
 "Lite Hit" (Cabell) – 6:21
 "Don't Let Me Lose This Dream" (Aretha Franklin, Ted White) – 6:56
 "Lite Hit" [alternate take] (Cabell) – 6:07 Bonus track on CD reissue
 "Buddy Boy" – 6:36 Bonus track on CD reissue
 "2 J" – 7:46 Bonus track on CD reissue
 "Sweet Pea" – 5:22 Bonus track on CD reissue
 Recorded at Rudy Van Gelder Studio, Englewood Cliffs, New Jersey on August 15 (tracks 1-7) and June 9 (tracks 8-10), 1969.

Personnel
Big John Patton – organ
Marvin Cabell – tenor saxophone, flute
George Coleman – tenor saxophone (tracks 8-10)
James Blood Ulmer – guitar (tracks 1-7)
Leroy Williams – drums

References

Blue Note Records albums
John Patton (musician) albums
1969 albums
Albums recorded at Van Gelder Studio
Albums produced by Francis Wolff